Sommerxylon is a genus described from petrified trunks of Gymnosperms that lived in the Triassic, found in the Caturrita Formation on Linha São Luiz in the municipality of Faxinal do Soturno in the region of Paleorrota. It is named in honor of Dr. Margot Guerra Sommer.

Description

Pith composed of parenchyma cells and sclerenchyma cells, primary xylem is endarch, secondary xylem with points with halos that dominate, thick radial walls of tracheids, absence of resin canals and axial parenchyma, which lead to some authors suggesting a close  relationship to the family Taxaceae. However, other authors have considered their affinities to the family equivocal.

References

 Kaokoxylon zalesskyi (Sahni) Maheshwari en los niveles superiores de la Secuencia Santa Maria
 O complexo Dadoxylon-Araucarioxylon, Carbonífero e Permiano
 Técnica de coleta e estabilização de fósseis em pelitos laminados, aplicação em níveis com plantas do Triássico Superior

Taxaceae
Prehistoric gymnosperm genera